Turkey Creek Township is a township in Barber County, Kansas, USA.  As of the 2000 census, its population was 37.

Geography
According to the USGS, it contains one cemetery, Chinn.

References
 USGS Geographic Names Information System (GNIS)

External links
 US-Counties.com
 City-Data.com

Townships in Barber County, Kansas
Townships in Kansas